The basivertebral veins are veins within the vertebral column. They are contained in large, tortuous channels in the substance of the bones, similar in every respect to those found in the diploë of the cranial bones.

They emerge from the foramina on the posterior surfaces of the vertebral bodies.

They communicate through small openings on the front and sides of the vertebral bodies with the anterior external vertebral plexuses, and converge behind to the principal canal, which is sometimes double toward its posterior part, and open by valved orifices into the transverse branches which unite the anterior internal vertebral plexuses.

The basivertebral veins become greatly enlarged in advanced age.

References

External links
  - "Venous Drainage of the Vertebral Column"

Veins of the torso